Ali-John Utush is a retired Nicuraguan-American soccer player who played professionally in the USL A-League.

Utush graduated from Oakmont High School.  He began his collegiate career in 1995 at De Anza College.  He was an All-West Regional player that season.  Utush then transferred to Saint Mary's College of California, playing three seasons (1996-1998) there.  In February 2000, the Los Angeles Galaxy selected Utush in the sixth round (71st overall) of the 2000 MLS SuperDraft.  The Galaxy released Utush during the pre-season.   In April 2000, Utush then signed with the Seattle Sounders of the USL A-League.  In June 2000, he was called up by the Colorado Rapids for several games, he played for them in exhibition games, but never came off the bench for an MLS game.  In the fall of 2000, Utush moved to SV Ried of Austria.  He returned to Seattle in July 2001.  On August 23, 2001, the Sounders waived Utush.

References 

Living people
1977 births
American soccer players
American expatriate soccer players
Saint Mary's Gaels men's soccer players
Bay Area Seals players
Colorado Rapids players
Seattle Sounders (1994–2008) players
SV Ried players
A-League (1995–2004) players
LA Galaxy draft picks
Association football midfielders
Association football defenders